Toluic acid may refer to the following isomers:

o-Toluic acid
m-Toluic acid
p-Toluic acid